The following is a list of the Teen Choice Award winners and nominees for Choice Movie – Comedy.

Winners and nominees

1999

2000s

2010s

References

Comedy